Mélonin Noumonvi (born 10 October 1982 in Paris) is  a French Greco-Roman (under 84 kg) wrestler.

At the Beijing 2008 Olympics, he lost to the eventual champion Andrea Minguzzi of Italy in the round of 16 and lost the bronze medal bout to Sweden's Ara Abrahamian. However, after Abrahamian refused to take home the bronze medal, he decided to take it. However, the IOC would not allow him that medal, as it was not affected by Abrahamian's tantrum. Furious, Noumonvi began to attack the IOC, but was stopped by security. He was eventually banned from wrestling for a year, but as of 2010, his ban has been lifted. At the London 2012 Olympics, he controversially lost his quarter-final bout to Egypt's Karam Gaber. Two seconds from the end of the third period of that bout, he appeared to manage to take down his opponent. The referees validated the takedown but the judge overruled it. He subsequently lost the bronze medal bout to Poland's Damian Janikowski.

References

External links
 

Living people
1982 births
French male sport wrestlers
Olympic wrestlers of France
Wrestlers at the 2004 Summer Olympics
Wrestlers at the 2008 Summer Olympics
Wrestlers at the 2012 Summer Olympics
Sportspeople from Paris
European Games bronze medalists for France
European Games medalists in wrestling
Wrestlers at the 2015 European Games

World Wrestling Championships medalists

Mediterranean Games gold medalists for France
Mediterranean Games bronze medalists for France
Competitors at the 2005 Mediterranean Games
Competitors at the 2009 Mediterranean Games
Competitors at the 2013 Mediterranean Games
Mediterranean Games medalists in wrestling
Wrestlers at the 2019 European Games
European Wrestling Championships medalists
21st-century French people